Anna van der Breggen (born 18 April 1990) is a Dutch former professional road bicycle racer, who rode professionally between 2009 and 2021 for Team Flexpoint,  and . She won the gold medal in the women's road race at the 2016 Summer Olympics in Rio de Janeiro, and has won the Giro d'Italia Femminile on four occasions. In 2018 and 2020, she won the women's road race at the UCI Road World Championships.

Considered one of the most versatile riders of her generation, van der Breggen excelled in both the one-day classics and stage races, particularly when run on a hilly terrain. Apart from the Olympic road race title and three Giro Rosa titles, other notable wins include La Flèche Wallonne on seven consecutive occasions, Liège–Bastogne–Liège two times, the Tour of Flanders, Amstel Gold Race, Strade Bianche, Omloop Het Nieuwsblad and the European Road Race Championships. In addition, she has won the general classification and numerous stages in smaller stage races.

In 2017, she won all three Ardennes classics races in one week, which earned her the nickname Queen of the Ardennes. She went on to secure her second Giro d'Italia win the following summer. In April 2019, she won the La Flèche Wallonne Féminine, her fifth-consecutive win in the race. In 2020, she won both the Individual Time Trial as well as the Road Race at the UCI World Championships.

Following her retirement at the end of the 2021 season, van der Breggen now works as a directeur sportif for her final professional team, UCI Women's WorldTeam .

Career

Early life and amateur career
Anna van der Breggen was born in Zwolle into a cycling family. She has three brothers and a sister who all practiced cycling at some point. She started bike-racing at the age of seven with the local club WV Noordwesthoek and became more serious about it in the juniors category. In 2007, aged 17, she was fifth in the juniors world championship road race in Aguascalientes but had a difficult transition to the elite category. She considered quitting the sport after she suffered in the back of the peloton during the Grote Prijs Gerrie Knetemann.

2012–2013: Turning professional
In April, she took a ninth-placed finish at the Tour of Flanders, and in July, she won the Tour de Bretagne Féminin. She won three of the four stages and secured the overall classification with a lead of almost three minutes over Sofie De Vuyst. She also won the time trial at the Tour Féminin en Limousin as well as the gold medal in the women's under-23 time-trialling event at the European championships. As a result, she was selected for the 2012 World Championships. Whilst playing a domestique role for her team leader, Marianne Vos, she managed to finish fifth herself in the road race.

In 2013 she devoted herself to finishing her studies and rode a low-key season, with the highlight of the year a fourth place at the Trofeo Alfredo Binda. After she obtained her nursing degree, she became a full-time professional cyclist and finished 18th in the Giro Rosa in the summer. She was selected to compete in the World Championships in Florence where she finished fourth in the road race. In preparation for the 2014 season, she announced she would be joining the  team.

2014: Stage race success

Van der Breggen's first season on the Rabo team proved highly fruitful. She opened the year with top-10 finishes in the Ronde van Drenthe, Trofeo Alfredo Binda, and the Tour of Flanders, and started showing her stage racing potential throughout the season. She claimed notable wins in the overall classification of both the Ladies Tour of Norway and Grand Prix Elsy Jacobs in Luxembourg; as well as a runner-up spot in the Belgium Tour and third places in the Emakumeen Euskal Bira and the Giro Rosa, in a podium made up entirely of  riders.

Her season came to an abrupt end when she broke her pelvis at the UCI Road World Championships in Ponferrada, Spain. Her teammate Annemiek van Vleuten crashed just before the finish of the Women's Team Time Trial after clipping the roadside barriers and brought down van der Breggen and two other riders. Van der Breggen broke her ilium and was transported to hospital.

2015: First Giro Rosa win

She recovered from her pelvic fracture in the winter of 2015 and won her first major classic, the Omloop Het Nieuwsblad, in late February. She beat her fellow Dutch in the sprint. The following week, she was second in Le Samyn des Dames. In April she won La Flèche Wallonne with an attack at the foot of the Mur de Huy, and recorded several podium positions in one-day races. She highlighted her stage race potential again by taking the overall classification at the Grand Prix Elsy Jacobs, which she led from the prologue to the end of the race.

In June, she won the bronze medal in the women's road race at the inaugural European Games in Baku. She was part of a four-woman breakaway together with Ellen van Dijk, Katarzyna Niewiadoma and Alena Amialiusik, when an acceleration by van der Breggen caused her teammate van Dijk to be dropped, for the race to be decided in a three-up sprint. Van der Breggen led out the sprint from afar but was passed by both Amialiusik and Niewiadoma.

Van der Breggen claimed her greatest career victory to that point in July when she won the general classification at the Giro d'Italia Femminile, the most important stage race on the women's calendar and the only Grand Tour for women. She finished fourth in the prologue and second in stage 2, after which she remained in the top-three until the Alpine stages. Van der Breggen was in third position overall behind maglia rosa wearer Megan Guarnier, when she moved into the race lead on the penultimate day after winning the individual time trial to Nebbiuno. She won the time trial more than one minute ahead of Guarnier and secured her overall win with a second place in the final stage. Later she won the second edition of La Course by Le Tour de France on the Champs-Élysées; and she won the final stage of the Belgium Tour in Geraardsbergen.

At the World Championships in September in Richmond, she claimed the silver medals in both the individual time trial and the road race. She finished at two seconds from Linda Villumsen in the time trial, and was narrowly beaten by Lizzie Armitstead in the road race after she started the sprint from afar. She ended the year as second in the UCI Road World Cup, behind Armitstead, and was awarded the Gerrit Schulte Trophy for best female Dutch cyclist of the year.

2016: Olympic and European champion
Van der Breggen opened the 2016 season with 5th place at the Strade Bianche, 4th at the Ronde van Drenthe and 6th at the Trofeo Alfredo Binda in March; but failed to claim a victory until she successfully defended her title at La Flèche Wallonne.

In July, she finished third overall in the Giro Rosa. She was third in the prologue, but lost time in the mountain stages in the Dolomites. She climbed back to third place after finishing second in stage 7's individual time trial and held on to her podium place until the finish.
During the Giro she announced she would leave  to join  for the 2017 season onwards.

On 7 August 2016, van der Breggen won the gold medal in the women's road race at the Rio Olympics. Van Vleuten jumped away shortly before the top and only Abbott managed to join. Van der Breggen beat Johansson and Longo Borghini in the three-up sprint on Copacabana Beach to become Olympic road race champion. Three days later she won the bronze medal in the individual time trial, 11 seconds behind winner Kristin Armstrong. Following her Olympic success, she was knighted in the Order of Orange-Nassau.

In mid-September, she took part in the European Road Championships. She finished second in the time trial behind Ellen van Dijk. In the road race she followed an acceleration of Niewiadoma on the final climb, together with Longo Borghini, Alena Amialiusik and Rasa Leleivytė. Van der Breggen launched the five-woman sprint from afar and became the first ever professional European road race champion. At the World Championships in October, she was a disappointing 13th in the time trial and 87th in the road race, telling reporters she "didn't have the legs anymore after a long season".

2017: Ardennes Triple and second Giro win

After placing 15th in both the Ronde van Drenthe and the Tour of Flanders, and finishing second overall in the Healthy Ageing Tour in early 2017, van der Breggen became the first woman to win all three of the Ardennes classics in a single year. Three days later, she secured her third straight Flèche Wallonne win after powering away on the Mur de Huy, before emerging triumphant at the first ever Liège–Bastogne–Liège the following Sunday. Her dominance in the climbers races earned her the nickname Queen of the Ardennes. Three weeks later she won the Tour of California, after she surpassed Katie Hall during the last stage thanks to bonus seconds won at an intermediate sprint.

In the summer, she won the Giro Rosa for the second time. Her  team had won the opening Team time trial, and van der Breggen moved into the race lead after placing second in stage 2. She won the final general classification with more than a minute over Elisa Longo Borghini and Annemiek van Vleuten. After Tom Dumoulin's win in the men's Giro d'Italia held in May, it was the first time a Grand Tour was won by both a Dutch man and woman in the same year.

Later van der Breggen won a stage and was second overall in the Holland Ladies Tour, which secured her lead in the final standing of the UCI Women's World Tour ahead of van Vleuten. She also placed second in the individual time trial behind van Vleuten, and eighth in the road race.

2018: Queen of the Classics and first rainbow jersey

As world number one, she kicked off the 2018 season at the Strade Bianche. Three weeks later she won the Tour of Flanders after a  solo breakaway. Van der Breggen made her decisive move on the Kruisberg and increased her lead over the Oude Kwaremont and Paterberg to claim her first Tour of Flanders win.

The following week she won the opening time trial and finished fourth overall in the Healthy Ageing Tour, before attempting to defend her titles in the Ardennes classics. She finished 38th in the Amstel Gold Race after an early crash, but won her fourth consecutive Flèche Wallonne three days later, on her 28th birthday. She concluded the Ardennes week with her second win in Liège–Bastogne–Liège, after she powered away from Amanda Spratt on the uphill drag to the finish line.

Following the spring classics, Van der Breggen was unable to mount a defence of her title at the Tour of California and rode at the Emakumeen Euskal Bira instead: the two races clashed on the calendar, Boels-Dolmans did not have enough riders or staff to send squads to both, and chose to enter the European race. Van der Breggen also elected not to defend her Giro Rosa title in 2018, choosing instead to focus on preparing for a bid to win her first title at the Road World Championships. She did compete in La Course in July, held on a mountainous parcours: Van der Breggen attacked in the final kilometre of a climb up the Col de la Colombière and led over the top, being pursued on the 14 km descent by Van Vleuten. However, Van der Breggen ran out of steam on the rise to the finish line in Le Grand-Bornand, and was overhauled by Van Vleuten in the last 100 metres of the race. The following month she raced at the European Road Championships, where she was narrowly defeated in the time trial by countrywoman Ellen van Dijk, securing a one-two for the Netherlands.

At the Worlds in Innsbruck in September, she started her campaign by taking a silver alongside her Boels-Dolmans team-mates in the women's team time trial. She took a second silver in the individual time trial, where she was denied the rainbow jersey by her compatriot Van Vleuten and formed part of a Dutch clean sweep of the podium places ahead of the third placed Van Dijk. She finally won her first Worlds gold in the road race, bridging over from a chase group to a group of five at the head of the race on the penultimate climb, before launching a solo attack with 39 km to go and crossing the finishing line alone with a lead of over three and a half minutes over runner-up Amanda Spratt.

2019: Success on- and off-road
Van der Breggen started her 2019 season relatively quietly, making her first two road appearances in the spring at Omloop Het Nieuwsblad and Strade Bianche: in the latter race she worked as a domestique for team-mate Annika Langvad, who finished in second. Having made some appearances in mountain bike racing the previous year, in March she entered the Cape Epic mountain bike stage race alongside Langvad: the duo won the race by over half an hour. She subsequently announced that she would not defend her Tour of Flanders title so she could recover from her exertions at the Cape Epic, focusing instead on the Health Ageing Tour and the Ardennes Classics later in April. She went on to win her fifth consecutive Flèche Wallonne attacking with 200 m to the finish line on the Mur de Huy to match Marianne Vos' record for wins at the race and securing her first road win since the 2018 Worlds. In May she won the overall at the Tour of California, as well as taking the opening stage after attacking on the final climb of the day to cross the finishing line alone.

Later in the year, Van der Breggen won the GP de Plouay – Bretagne with a solo attack 10 km from the finishing line. At the Road World Championships in Yorkshire, she took two silver medals: in the individual time trial she finished behind champion Chloé Dygert and ahead of Van Vleuten, whilst in the road race she acted as a marker in a chase group attempting to reel in her team-mate Van Vleuten, who made an ultimately successful long-range solo attack with 104 km to go. Van der Breggen attacked fellow chaser Amanda Spratt in the closing kilometres of the course to secure the silver.

2020: Third Giro win and Worlds double
In 2020 Van der Breggen enjoyed some early season success at the Setmana Ciclista Valenciana in February: she won the race's second stage with a solo attack on the final climb, the 8.3 km-long Alto de Tudons, taking the overall race lead in the process, which she held on the remaining two stages of the race. In May she announced that she would retire from competition at the end of 2021 after the postponed 2020 Summer Olympics, which are now scheduled to be held in the summer of 2021 due to the COVID-19 pandemic. 

Upon the resumption of racing in July, she finished third in the Emakumeen Nafarroako Klasikoa and second in Durango-Durango Emakumeen Saria before placing fourth at Strade Bianche. In August she won the Dutch National Road Race Championships for the first time in her career: before the halfway point of the race she and Anouska Koster bridged across to Van der Breggen's team-mate Jip van den Bos, who had earlier broken away from the peloton. Van der Breggen eventually dropped the other two riders at the front, whilst they were being chased by another three rider group of Van Vleuten, Vos and Amy Pieters, which similarly disintegrated when Van Vleuten dropped the other two riders. Van der Breggen crossed the finish line over a minute ahead of Van Vlueten in second. Shortly afterwards she took the gold medal in the individual time trial at the European Road Championships in Plouay, finishing 30 seconds ahead of Van Dijk.

The following month Van der Breggen won the Giro Rosa, becoming the fourth woman to win three editions of the race. She went into the lead on the penultimate eighth stage, where she was pipped to the stage win by Elisa Longo Borghini after the pair went clear of the rest of the leading group on the final climb, taking the pink jersey from Katarzyna Niewiadoma, who in turn had inherited it after previous leader Van Vleuten crashed out of the race on the previous day. Later that month, at the UCI Road World Championships in Imola, Van der Breggen was crowned world time trial champion for the first time, having previously taken four silver medals in the event: she finished ahead of Marlen Reusser and Van Dijk after reigning champion Dygert crashed out of the race. She went on to win a second road race world title, following and overhauling an acceleration by Van Vleuten with an attack over the top of the penultimate climb of the Cima Gallisterna with 40 km to the finish, and taking victory with a margin of 1 minute 40 seconds over silver and bronze medallists Van Vleuten and Longo Borghini. In doing so she became only the second rider in history to win world titles in the time trial and the road race in the same year, after Jeannie Longo in 1995. Shortly after the Worlds, Van der Breggen set a new record for wins at Flèche Wallonne when she won the race for a sixth time, moving one clear of Vos, outclimbing Cecilie Uttrup Ludwig and Demi Vollering up the final ascent of the Mur de Huy to clinch victory.

2021: Fourth Giro win, retirement 
In 2021, Van der Breggen won her fourth Giro Donne, as well as other races including La Flèche Wallonne Féminine (for a record seventh time), the Vuelta a Burgos Feminas, and Omloop Het Nieuwsblad. She also won the Dutch National Time Trial Championships for the second time. At the Tokyo 2020 Olympics, she won a bronze medal in the time trial competition, before retiring from professional competition.

Directeur sportif role 
Following her retirement, van der Breggen now works as a directeur sportif for her final professional team, UCI Women's WorldTeam SD Worx.

Personal life
Van der Breggen lives in Hasselt, in the northeast of the Netherlands, with her husband Sierk Jan de Haan, who is a coach for UCI WorldTeam . She comes from a religious family and is a member of the Reformed Churches in the Netherlands (Liberated). She is a trained nurse, having graduated from nursing school in 2012. Apart from cycling, she plays the piano and enjoys painting and knitting.

Major results

2007
 5th Road race, UCI Juniors World Championships
2008
 6th Road race, UEC European Junior Road Championships
 10th Parel van de Veluwe
2009
 2nd Ronde van Noordhorn
 4th Profronde van Surhuisterveen
 6th Ronde van De Westereen
 8th Profronde van Stiphout
 9th Ronde van Heerenveen
2010
 1st Ronde van Noordeloos
 1st Ronde van Oudewater
 2nd Ronde van Waddinxveen
 5th Gouden Pijl
 6th Omloop van Strijen
 9th Profronde van Surhuisterveen
2011
 2nd Ronde van Noordeloos
 5th Berkelse Wielerdag
 6th Profronde van Stiphout
 8th Profronde van Surhuisterveen
2012
 1st  Time trial, UEC European Under-23 Road Championships
 1st  Overall Tour de Bretagne Féminin
1st  Points classification
1st  Young rider classification
1st Stages 1, 2 (ITT) & 4
 1st Duo Normand
 1st Ronde van Noordeloos
 2nd Overall Trophée d'Or Féminin
1st Stage 2 (TTT)
 2nd Omloop van de IJsseldelta
 2nd Wenduine
 3rd Ronde van Noordhorn
 4th GP de Plouay – Bretagne
 4th Belsele (Sint-Niklaas)
 4th Profronde van Surhuisterveen
 5th Road race, UCI Road World Championships
 5th Time trial, National Road Championships
 5th Overall Ster Zeeuwsche Eilanden
 5th Overall Tour Féminin en Limousin
1st  Young rider classification
1st Stage 2 (ITT)
 6th GP Comune di Cornaredo
 6th Ronde van Luyksgestel
 7th Overall Holland Ladies Tour
 9th Tour of Flanders
2013
 1st Omloop van de IJsseldelta
 2nd Overall Trophée d'Or Féminin
 2nd Ronde van Zuid Oost-Friesland
 2nd RaboRonde Heerlen
 3rd GP de Plouay
 4th Road race, UCI Road World Championships
 4th Overall Emakumeen Euskal Bira
 4th Overall Thüringen Rundfahrt der Frauen
 Open de Suède Vårgårda
4th Team time trial
5th Road race
 4th La Flèche Wallonne
 4th Holland Hills Classic
 4th Profwielerronde Etten-Leur
 4th Berkelse Wielerdag
 5th Overall Grand Prix Elsy Jacobs
 5th Overall Tour Languedoc Roussillon
 6th Le Samyn des Dames
 7th Overall Holland Ladies Tour
 7th Tour of Flanders
 8th Omloop Het Nieuwsblad
 9th Trofeo Alfredo Binda-Comune di Cittiglio
 10th Overall Energiewacht Tour
2014
 1st  Overall Ladies Tour of Norway
1st  Points classification
1st Stage 1
 1st  Overall Festival Luxembourgeois du cyclisme féminin Elsy Jacobs
1st Stage 1
 1st Dwars door de Westhoek
 2nd Overall Belgium Tour
1st  Mountains classification
1st Stages 2 (TTT) & 4
 2nd Ronde van Drenthe
 2nd Open de Suède Vårgårda TTT
 3rd Overall Emakumeen Euskal Bira
1st  Mountains classification
 3rd Overall Giro Rosa
 4th Trofeo Alfredo Binda-Comune di Cittiglio
 4th Durango-Durango Emakumeen Saria
 5th GP de Plouay
 6th Tour of Flanders for Women
 7th Holland Hills Classic
 10th Ronde van Gelderland
2015
 1st  Time trial, National Road Championships
 1st  Overall Giro Rosa
1st Stage 8 (ITT)
 1st  Overall Festival Luxembourgeois du cyclisme féminin Elsy Jacobs
1st Prologue
 1st La Flèche Wallonne
 1st Omloop Het Nieuwsblad
 1st La Course by Le Tour de France
 1st Open de Suède Vårgårda TTT
 2nd Overall UCI Women's Road World Cup
 UCI Road World Championships
2nd  Road race
2nd  Time trial
3rd  Team time trial
 2nd Le Samyn des Dames
 3rd  Road race, European Games
 3rd Overall Belgium Tour
1st  Mountains classification
1st Stage 4
 3rd Trofeo Alfredo Binda
 3rd Tour of Flanders
 3rd Time trial, EPZ Omloop van Borsele
 5th Overall Ladies Tour of Norway
 5th Strade Bianche
 5th Crescent Women World Cup Vårgårda
 6th GP de Plouay
 7th Overall Energiewacht Tour
1st  Combativity classification
1st Prologue & Stage 4
 7th Durango-Durango Emakumeen Saria
 8th Overall Emakumeen Euskal Bira
2016
 Olympic Games
1st  Road race
3rd  Time trial
 UEC European Road Championships
1st  Road race
2nd  Time trial
 1st Omloop van de IJsseldelta
 1st La Flèche Wallonne
 3rd Overall Giro Rosa
 3rd Overall Festival Luxembourgeois du cyclisme féminin Elsy Jacobs
 3rd Crescent Vårgårda UCI Women's WorldTour TTT
 4th Ronde van Drenthe
 5th Strade Bianche
 5th Giro dell'Emilia Internazionale Donne Elite
 6th Trofeo Alfredo Binda-Comune di Cittiglio
 7th Overall Holland Ladies Tour
2017
 1st  Overall UCI Women's World Tour
 1st  Overall Giro Rosa
1st Stage 1 (TTT)
 1st  Overall Tour of California
 1st Amstel Gold Race
 1st La Flèche Wallonne
 1st Liège–Bastogne–Liège
 1st Crescent Vårgårda UCI Women's WorldTour TTT
 UCI Road World Championships
2nd  Time trial
2nd  Team time trial
8th Road race
 2nd Overall Holland Ladies Tour
1st Stage 5
 2nd Overall Healthy Ageing Tour
1st Stage 2 (TTT)
 3rd  Time trial, UEC European Road Championships
 3rd Time trial, National Road Championships
2018
 UCI Road World Championships
1st  Road race
2nd  Time trial
2nd  Team time trial
 1st  Overall Cyprus Sunshine Cup
1st Stage 2
 1st Strade Bianche
 1st Tour of Flanders
 1st La Flèche Wallonne
 1st Liège–Bastogne–Liège
 1st Durango-Durango Emakumeen Saria
 UEC European Road Championships
2nd  Time trial
8th Road race
 2nd Time trial, National Road Championships
 2nd La Course by Le Tour de France
 2nd Postnord UCI WWT Vårgårda WestSweden TTT
 3rd Overall Emakumeen Euskal Bira
1st  Points classification
 3rd Overall Holland Ladies Tour
 4th Overall Healthy Ageing Tour
1st Stages 1 (ITT) & 3b (TTT)
2019
 1st  Overall Tour of California
1st  Sprints classification
1st Stage 1
 1st  Overall Cape Epic (with Annika Langvad)
 1st La Flèche Wallonne
 1st GP de Plouay – Bretagne
 UCI Road World Championships
2nd  Road race
2nd  Time trial
 2nd Overall Giro Rosa
1st Stage 9
 3rd Time trial, National Road Championships
 9th Overall Holland Ladies Tour
 9th Strade Bianche
 10th La Course by Le Tour de France
2020
 UCI Road World Championships
1st  Road race
1st  Time trial
 1st  Time trial, UEC European Road Championships
 1st  Road race, National Road Championships
 1st  Overall Giro Rosa
 1st  Overall Setmana Ciclista Valenciana
1st Stage 2
 1st La Flèche Wallonne
 2nd Durango-Durango Emakumeen Saria
 3rd Emakumeen Nafarroako Klasikoa
 4th Strade Bianche
2021
 1st  Time trial, National Road Championships
 1st  Overall Giro Rosa
1st  Points classification
1st Stages 2 & 4 (ITT)
 1st  Overall Vuelta a Burgos Feminas
1st  Points classification
1st  Mountains classification
1st Stage 4
 1st La Flèche Wallonne
 1st Omloop Het Nieuwsblad
 1st Gran Premio Ciudad de Eibar
 1st Durango-Durango Emakumeen Saria
 3rd  Time trial, Olympic Games
 3rd Strade Bianche
 4th La Course by Le Tour de France
 5th Liège–Bastogne–Liège
 8th Tour of Flanders

General classification results timeline

Classics results timeline

Major championship results timeline

See also
 UCI Women's Road World Cup
 UCI Women's World Tour
 List of women's road bicycle races

References

External links
 

1990 births
Living people
Dutch female cyclists
Dutch nurses
Sportspeople from Zwolle
Reformed Churches Christians from the Netherlands
UCI Road World Championships cyclists for the Netherlands
European Games bronze medalists for the Netherlands
Cyclists at the 2015 European Games
Cyclists from Overijssel
Cyclists at the 2016 Summer Olympics
Cyclists at the 2020 Summer Olympics
Olympic cyclists of the Netherlands
Olympic gold medalists for the Netherlands
Olympic bronze medalists for the Netherlands
Olympic medalists in cycling
Medalists at the 2016 Summer Olympics
Medalists at the 2020 Summer Olympics
Knights of the Order of Orange-Nassau
Cyclists at the 2019 European Games
European Games medalists in cycling
20th-century Dutch women
21st-century Dutch women